Petites esquisses d'oiseaux, is a piano work by Olivier Messiaen composed in 1985, dedicated to his wife Yvonne Loriod. It has six parts, three of which are devoted to robins.

Analysis 
In the preface, Messiaen writes:

Premiere 

The piece was premiered at the Théâtre de la Ville in Paris on 26 January 1987 by Yvonne Loriod. The duration is about 14 minutes.

Titles of the pieces 
The six movements are titled:
 Le Rouge-gorge (The Robin, Erithacus rubecula)
 Le Merle noir (The Common Blackbird, Turdus merula)
 Le Rouge-gorge (The Robin)
 La Grive musicienne (The Song Thrush, Turdus philomelos)
 Le Rouge-gorge (The Robin)
 L'Alouette des champs (The Eurasian Skylark, Alauda arvensis)

Recordings 
Recordings include:
 Yvonne Loriod, piano (+ Préludes, Quatre Études de rythme) Erato Records 2292-45505-2/V ECD 71589, 1987-88
 Paul Kim, piano (+ Catalogue d'oiseaux, La Fauvette des jardins) Centaur Records CRC 2567/68/69, 2001
 Fredrik Ullén, piano Disque BIS-CD-1803, 2012
 Marie Vermeulin, piano Disque paraty 612118, 2013

References

External links 
 Petites esquisses d'oiseaux (Bibliothèque Nationale de France)
 Messiaen - Petites esquisses d'oiseaux (Piano Street.com)
 Petites esquisses d'oiseaux
 Messiaen - Petites Esquisses d'Oiseaux
 Olivier Messiaen - Petites esquisses d'oiseaux (1985) (YouTube)

Petites Esquisses d'oiseaux
1987 compositions